Dosu may refer to:

 Dosu Joseph (born 1973), Nigerian football player
 Dosu River, Romania